The 2015 mid-year rugby union internationals (also known as the Summer internationals in the Northern Hemisphere) refer to international rugby union matches that were mostly played in the Southern Hemisphere.

Because of the 2015 Rugby World Cup, no test series took place. This allowed the European season to finish two weeks later, with the final of the 2014–15 Top 14 season taking place on 13 June. The 2015 Super Rugby season was able to run for 21 consecutive weeks, without the three-week international break in June, to allow an earlier and shortened 2015 Rugby Championship.

Although the international window did not take place, some nations participating in the World Cup opted to play uncapped matches in preparation for the tournament. Uruguay hosted Fiji's A side, the Fiji Warriors in Montevideo, with the Warriors playing Argentina's A-side Argentina Jaguars, between the two fixtures. With Russia not competing in the 2015 Rugby World Cup, or either of World Rugby's Nations Cup or Tbilisi Cup, they toured Namibia for a two-test series.

Three historic matches also took place. Samoa hosted New Zealand in Apia for the first time as an official test match, the first Pacific nation to do so. Kenya played two test matches, against Portugal and Spain. Portugal became the first European side to visit Kenya for an official test match.

Fixtures

23 May

Notes:
 Uruguay gave this match Test Match status and awarded caps in this match.

27–31 May

Notes:
 This was Nathan Hines and Shane Jennings last professional match.

Notes:
 Vasco Uva earned his 100th test cap.

Notes:
 This was Ugo Monye's and Brad Thorn's last professional match.
 This was England's largest winning margin over the Barbarians, surpassing the 31 point winning margin recorded in May 2012.
 This was the Barbarians largest ever defeat. It was previously the 59–8 loss to the British and Irish Lions during the 2013 British and Irish Lions tour to Australia.

Notes:
 Uruguay gave this match Test Match status, and awarded caps in this match.

20 June

26 June

8–11 July

Notes:
 This was the first match played by New Zealand against a Pacific Island team in the Pacific, and they became the first SANZAR team to play in Apia.
 Faialaga Afamasaga and Tim Nanai-Williams made their international debuts for Samoa.
 Nepo Laulala, George Moala, Charlie Ngatai and Brad Weber made their international debuts for New Zealand.

Notes:
 Benito Masilevu and Ben Volavola made their international debuts for Fiji.
 Fiji gave this match Test Match status and awarded caps in this match.

Notes:
 This was Namibia's first ever win over Russia.
 Namibia Captain Jacques Burger played in his first home since 2009, and was his first win since 2010.

18 July

See also
 Mid-year rugby union tests
 End-of-year rugby union tests
 2015 World Rugby Tbilisi Cup
 2015 World Rugby Nations Cup
 2015 World Rugby Pacific Nations Cup
 2015 Asian Rugby Championship
 2015 Rugby World Cup warm-up matches
 2015 Rugby World Cup
 2015 end-of-year rugby union internationals

References

2015
2014–15 in European rugby union
2015–16 in European rugby union
2015 in Oceanian rugby union
2015 in South American rugby union
2015 in African rugby union